Simon Piesinger (born 13 May 1992) is an Austrian professional footballer who plays as a defensive midfielder for Wolfsberger AC.

Club career
He started his professional career with LASK Linz Juniors playing in the Austrian Regional League. He then moved to FC Blau-Weiß Linz to play in the Austrian Football First League. In the summer of 2012, he was transferred to Austrian Bundesliga side FC Wacker Innsbruck. On 10 July 2014, he signed with SK Sturm Graz. 

In June 2019, Piesinger signed a two-year contract with Danish Superliga club Randers FC On 14 June 2021, he extended his contract until 2023.

On 3 June 2022, Randers announced that they had sold Piesinger to Wolfsberger AC, marking his return to Austria. He signed a three-year contract.

International career
He made his debut for the Austria U-21 team in 2012.

Honours
Randers
Danish Cup: 2020–21

References

External links
 Player profile at Hagmayr Sportmanagement
 

1992 births
Living people
Association football midfielders
Austrian footballers
Austrian expatriate footballers
Austria under-21 international footballers
2. Liga (Austria) players
Austrian Football Bundesliga players
FC Blau-Weiß Linz players
FC Wacker Innsbruck (2002) players
SK Sturm Graz players
SC Rheindorf Altach players
Randers FC players
Wolfsberger AC players
Austrian Regionalliga players
Danish Superliga players
Expatriate men's footballers in Denmark
Austrian expatriate sportspeople in Denmark
Footballers from Linz